This is a list of French television related events from 1957.

Events

Debuts
24 January - Voyage sans passeport (1957-1969)
A la découverte des Français

Television shows

1940s
Le Jour du Seigneur (1949–present)

1950s
Le Club du jeudi (1950-1961)
Magazine féminin (1952-1970)
Lectures pour tous (1953-1968)
La Boîte à sel (1955-1960)

Ending this year

Births
9 April - André Manoukian, jazz pianist, actor & TV personality
19 April - Bernard Montiel, TV presenter & actor
7 May - Véronique Jannot, actress & singer

Deaths

See also
1957 in France
List of French films of 1957